Rhopalosiphoninus is a genus of true bugs belonging to the family Aphididae.

The species of this genus are found in Europe, Australia, and North America.

Species:
 Neorhopalosiphoninus Ghosh & Raychaudhuri, 1968
 Rhopalosiphoninus smilacifoliae (Ghosh & Raychaudhuri, 1968)
 Rhopalosiphoninus solani (Thomas, 1879)
 Rhopalosiphoninus staphyleae (Koch, 1854)
 Pseudorhopalosiphoninus Heinze, 1961
 Rhopalosiphoninus calthae (Koch, 1854)
 Rhopalosiphoninus Baker, 1920
 Rhopalosiphoninus celtifoliae Shinji, 1924 
 Rhopalosiphoninus cephalospinulosus Tao, 1989
 Rhopalosiphoninus deutzifoliae Shinji, 1924
 Rhopalosiphoninus ehretis Bhattacharya & Chakrabarti, 1982
 Rhopalosiphoninus elsholtze Chakrabarti & Medda, 1989
 Rhopalosiphoninus hydrangeae (Matsumura, 1918)
 Rhopalosiphoninus ichigo (Shinji, 1922)
 Rhopalosiphoninus indicus
 Rhopalosiphoninus kelleri Smith & Knowlton, 1977
 Rhopalosiphoninus latysiphon (Davidson, 1912)
 Rhopalosiphoninus longisetosus Chakrabarti & Ghosh, 1974
 Rhopalosiphoninus maianthemi Stroyan, 1965
 Rhopalosiphoninus multirhinarious Tao, 1989
 Rhopalosiphoninus ribesinus (van der Goot, 1912)
 Rhopalosiphoninus tiliae (Matsumura, 1918)
 Submegoura Hille Ris Lambers, 1953
 Rhopalosiphoninus heikinheimoi (Börner, 1952)

References

Aphididae